André Bachand (born December 8, 1961) is a Canadian politician, who represented the riding of Richmond—Arthabaska as member of the Progressive Conservatives from 1997 to 2003.

When the PC Party was merged with the Canadian Alliance into the Conservative Party in December 2003, Bachand left the party and sat as an "Independent Progressive Conservative" until the 2004 election, and then retired from the House of Commons.

Born in Quebec City, Quebec, Bachand has been an administrator, and a business executive. He was the mayor of Asbestos, Quebec, from 1986 to 1997, and was the Préfet of the MRC d'Asbestos from 1987 to 1997.

Federal politics

Young Turk
Bachand was first elected as a member of the Progressive Conservative Party in 1997, one of five PC MPs elected that year in Quebec. Bachand was one of a handful of new "Young Turk" PC MPs (along with Scott Brison, John Herron and Peter MacKay) who were considered the future youthful leadership material that would restore the ailing Tories to their glory days. In 1998, Jean Charest stepped down as federal Progressive Conservative leader to make the move to Quebec provincial politics, becoming leader of the federalist Quebec Liberal Party (unaffiliated with the Liberal Party of Canada).  Bachand was one of many who unsuccessfully tried to convince Charest to remain in federal politics for at least one more election.  Joe Clark succeeded Charest as leader of the PC Party and Bachand was supportive of Clark's candidacy.

Difficult times
The Quebec-wing of the federal PC Party parliamentary Caucus wrestled with several internal policy issues in the late 1990s after Charest's departure including the party's bilingualism policies and the autonomy of provinces in respect to federal powers. Shortly after Joe Clark was elected leader of the federal Tory Party, the federal government brought forward the Clarity Act.  The Clarity Act was a Liberal Party of Canada sponsored Bill introduced by then Minister of Intergovernmental affairs Stéphane Dion. The Clarity Act detailed specifically how the province of Quebec could separate and under what conditions a separation could be legal. Clark and seven other PC MP's chose to support Bachand and the Quebec PC Caucus MPs in opposing the Clarity Act while the remaining MPs in the PC parliamentary Caucus voted in favour of the Bill regardless of Clark's stance.

Quebec lieutenant
By 1999, Bachand had emerged as the nominal Quebec lieutenant of the Conservatives, attending most PC events in the province with Clark and acting as the party's chief spokesman for Quebec issues.  Bachand also was the chief responder to the multiple defections of Quebec Tory party officials, MPs and Senators to the Liberal and Canadian Alliance Parties during this period. In September 2000, three Quebec PC MPs, fearful of their re-election prospects under Clark's leadership, crossed the floor shortly before the federal election to sit as Liberal MPs, leaving Bachand as the only remaining PC MP in Quebec. He was subsequently re-elected in the 2000 election, as were all three of the MPs who crossed the floor.  The Tories emerged from the election retaining party status.

Deputy leader
In February 2003, Bachand announced his candidacy for the leadership of the Progressive Conservatives. However, on May 12, he announced that he was dropping out of the race and supporting Peter MacKay. Bachand had been running fifth in the race, and had failed to gather support among party delegates and to raise enough money for his campaign. After MacKay's victory, Bachand briefly served as Deputy Leader of the Progressive Conservatives until early December 2003.  Before becoming Deputy Leader, Bachand served as the Deputy House Leader of the Progressive Conservative Party, as well as its critic for the Intergovernmental Affairs, Industry, Science Research and Development, and the Deputy Prime Minister portfolios.

Lone independent
When the party merged with the Canadian Alliance at the end of 2003, Bachand announced that he would retire from politics. Bachand did not sit with the new Conservative Party of Canada Caucus, and became an independent MP until the June 2004 election. During the June 2004 election, Bachand endorsed the Liberal candidate in the Richmond—Arthabaska race over the Conservative and Bloc Québécois challengers.  The riding was ultimately carried by the BQ in their electoral sweep of the province.

Bachand's departure from federal politics has been lamented by many Tories hailing from Quebec. In a Maclean's article covering the March 2005 founding policy convention of the new Conservative Party, Senator Pierre Claude Nolin mused that if Bachand had remained elected and participatory in the new party, he may served as the new Conservative Party's chief Quebec lieutenant as part of Stephen Harper's attempts to woo Quebec voters.

Return to politics
In September 2008, Bachand announced that he would be the Conservative Party candidate for the district of Sherbrooke in the 40th Canadian General Election. On election night, Bachand's comeback attempt was unsuccessful. He lost to Bloc Québécois incumbent Serge Cardin, finishing third with 16.4% of the vote.

Shortly after his election defeat, Bachand was appointed by Harper as Canada's ambassador to UNESCO in Paris.

In October 2011, Harper appointed Bachand as his senior advisor on Quebec issues. The post, which previously had been combined with responsibility for being Harper's communications advisor, was reportedly separated from other responsibilities in order to make space for Bachand.

In 2013, Maclean's included Bachand as one of the thirteen members of Harper's "inner circle," of most-trusted advisors, tasked "to try to improve Conservative fortunes in Quebec."

In September 2013, Bachand was hired by the Earnscliffe Strategy Group, an Ottawa public-affairs firm.

Provincial politics
Bachand ran for the Coalition Avenir Québec in the riding of Richmond, going on to win in the 2018 provincial election.

Electoral record

Provincial

Richmond

Federal

Sherbrooke

Richmond—Arthabaska

References

External links
 

1961 births
Conservative Party of Canada candidates for the Canadian House of Commons
French Quebecers
Living people
Members of the House of Commons of Canada from Quebec
Politicians from Quebec City
Progressive Conservative Party of Canada MPs
Progressive Conservative Party of Canada leadership candidates
Coalition Avenir Québec MNAs